Smap Vest is the third greatest hits album by Japanese boy band SMAP. It was released on 23 March 2001 through Victor Entertainment. It includes all of the band's singles from 1991 through 2000. The album debuted at number one on the Oricon Albums Chart, selling 1,005,000 copies in its first week. In April 2001, it was certified Quadruple Platinum by the Recording Industry Association of Japan for shipments of 1,600,000 units. Smap Vest was the seventh best-selling album of 2001 in Japan, with over 1,679,000 copies sold by the end of the year. It is the band's highest-selling album. As of December 2016, the album has sold 1,827,000 copies in Japan.

The album won the Japan Gold Disc Award for Pop Album of the Year at the 16th Japan Gold Disc Awards.

Track listing

References

External links
 Product information

2001 greatest hits albums
Victor Entertainment compilation albums
Japanese-language albums